Quest is a 1996 German animated short film directed by Tyron Montgomery, written (story) and produced by Thomas Stellmach at the University of Kassel - Art College. After four years of production it won several awards including the Academy Award for Best Animated Short Film.

Supported by the German Federal Film Board and the Cultural Film Fund of the State of Hessian the puppet animation film was shot frame by frame with an ARRI II BV and a self constructed single frame motor. The character was made of brass skeleton, latex foam and sand. Together with the flying paper, the falling stones and the rotating machines the puppet was manipulated and photographed 19,000 times and reviewed only by video control. No digital compositing software was used.

Quest is distributed by Thomas Stellmach. It is part of the Animation Show of Shows as well.

Story
In quest of water, a sand puppet leaves the sand world in which it lives. It wanders through other worlds made of paper, stone and iron, following the sound of dripping water. In the end the sand puppet manages to reach the water... in a very tragic way.

Awards

 OSCAR© of the Academy of Motion Picture Arts and Sciences (AMPAS) for the Best Short Animation Film 1996, (awarded 1997), Los Angeles 
 Certificate: "exceptional valuable" Film Valuation Authority Wiesbaden, Germany
 CARTOON D'OR 96, best film of the European Animated Prize Winner Films, awarded by the European Association of Animation Film, Brussels, Belgium
 Grand Prix for best school film 1997, European First Film Festival of Angers, France
 GRAND PRIX of the European Short Film Competition 1997, Brussels
 Best Debut Film 1997, World Animation Film Festival, Los Angeles, USA
 Special Jury Prize 1997, Clermont Ferrand Short Film Festival, France
 Bronze Worldmedal 1997, New York Festival, USA
 ALVES COSTA PRIZE, Special Award of the Journalists, International Animation Film Festival Espinho, CINANIMA 96, Portugal
 ZLATKO GRIGIC - Prize for Best Debut Film, International Animation Film Festival Zagreb 1996, Croatia
 Golden Damby award International Animation EXPO Seoul 1997, Korea
 CITY OF MELBOURNE AWARD for Best Animation Film 1996, International Film Festival of Melbourne, Australia
 DON QUIJOTE - Prize of the critics FICC International Short Film Festival of Kraków, Poland
 GOLD HUGO, 1996, Student Animation Category, International Film Festival Chicago, USA
 Best European Short Film, International Film Festival Cork 1996, Ireland
 Best Animation 1996, Albany International Short Film Festival, USA
 Best Animation 1997, MEDIAWAVE, International Festival of Media Arts, Győr, Hungary
 Best Animation 1996, Molodist - Kyiv International Film Festival, Ukraine
 Grand Prix for Best School Film 1997, International Film Festival Huy, Belgium
 Grand Prix 1997, International Film Festival of Environment, "Green Vision", St. Petersburg
 Grand Prix International Mountain and Adventure Film Festival Graz 1997, Austria
 Category Award (10 to 30 min), International Animation Film Festival "Krok", Kyiv 1997, Ukraine
 First Audience Prize of the German TV Station - SDR 1996, International Animation Film Festival of Stuttgart, Germany
 SILVER DANZANTE for the best Animation Film 1996, International Short Film Festival of Huesca, Spain
 Nominated for the German Short Film Award 1996, Federal Ministry of the Interior, Germany
 First Audience Prize of the 7 nominated German short films 1996, Federal Ministry of the Interior, Germany
 ANIMAT'T Award, Sitges International Fantasy Film Festival of Barcelona 1996, Spain
 First Audience Prize 1996, International Film Celebration of Dresden, Germany
 Jury Special Award 1996, Festival international du film d'environnement, Rienna, France
 SECOND PRIZE 1996, International Short Film Festival Drama, Greece
 Best Animation Film 1996, International Short Film Festival of Hamburg, Germany
 OEKOMEDIA Award for the Best Artistic Achievement 1996, International Ecological Film Festival of Freiburg
 Germany Special Prize of the Federal Minister of the Environment for Outstanding Achievement in the Field of Environment Education 1996, Oekomedia, International Ecological Film Festival of Freiburg
 Special Prize of the National Park Administration "Lower Saxony Mud-flats" 1996, Maritime Film Days of Wilhelmshaven, Germany
 Laudable Mention of pupils 1996, Maritime Film Days of Wilhelmshaven, Germany
 Second Prize 1996, Exground on screen, Wiesbaden, Germany
 Tour Prize of the University Kassel 1996, Germany
 Friedrich-Wilhelm-Murnau-Prize 1996 Wiesbaden, Germany
 Compilation Best of Ottawa 1996, International Animation Film Festival of Ottawa, Canada

Preservation
The Academy Film Archive preserved Quest in 2010.

Bibliography
Olivier Cotte (2007) Secrets of Oscar-winning animation: Behind the scenes of 13 classic short animations. (Making of Quest) Focal Press.

External links
Quest
Quest (French)
Quest (Persian)

Notes

1996 films
1996 animated films
1990s animated short films
German animated short films
Best Animated Short Academy Award winners
Animated films without speech
1990s German films